Estadio Compensar is a multi-use stadium in Bogotá, Colombia.  It is currently used mostly for football matches and was the home stadium of Academia FC.  The stadium holds 4,500 people and opened in 1998.

References

Compensar
Sports venues in Bogotá